Felipe Van de Wyngard (born 11 May 1981 in Santiago) is a Chilean triathlete.

At the 2012 Summer Olympics men's triathlon on Tuesday, August 7, he placed 50th. He is of Dutch descent.

References 

1981 births
Living people
Chilean male triathletes
Triathletes at the 2003 Pan American Games
Pan American Games competitors for Chile
Triathletes at the 2012 Summer Olympics
Olympic triathletes of Chile
Sportspeople from Santiago
Triathletes at the 2015 Pan American Games
20th-century Chilean people
21st-century Chilean people